Chrysoesthia halymella is a moth of the family Gelechiidae. It is found in Palestine.

The larvae feed on Atriplex halimus.

References

Moths described in 1931
Chrysoesthia